In nonstandard analysis, a monad or also a halo is the set of points infinitesimally close to a given point.)

Given a hyperreal number x in R∗, the monad of x is the set

If x is finite (limited), the unique real number in the monad of x is called the standard part of x.

References

Nonstandard analysis